Radonjić may refer to:

Radonjić (surname)
, a village in the municipality of Gjakova, Kosovo
Radonjić Lake, Kosovo

See also
Radonjići, a village in the municipality of Pale, Bosnia and Herzegovina
Radonić (disambiguation)